Long & Foster Real Estate is part of The Long & Foster Companies, a subsidiary of HomeServices of America, a Berkshire Hathaway affiliate. HomeServices is the nation’s largest real estate brokerage by transaction sides and one of the largest providers of integrated real estate services. The Long & Foster Companies is the parent company of Long & Foster Real Estate, Prosperity Home Mortgage, LLC, Long & Foster Insurance, and Mid-States Title, as well as HomeServices Property Management, Insight Home Inspections, Tailored Move, Long & Foster Vacation Rentals, Long & Foster Corporate Real Estate Services and Urban Pace. Long & Foster Real Estate is a member of Forbes Global Properties, and it is a founding affiliate of Leading Real Estate Companies of the World, a prestigious global network of real estate professionals that includes the Luxury Portfolio International division.

Long & Foster has over 9,000 agents in more than 200 sales offices in the Mid-Atlantic and Northeast regions. It is part of The Long & Foster Companies, a family of businesses in the real estate and financial services industries. In September 2017, Berkshire Hathaway's HomeServices of America bought Long & Foster.

History 
In 1968, P. Wesley "Wes" Foster Jr. co-founded Long & Foster with Henry "Hank" Long. Long & Foster began with Foster handling the residential real estate arm of the business and Long handling the commercial side. Foster became the sole owner in July 1979, 11 years after establishing Long & Foster. Foster currently serves as the chief executive officer and chairman. Foster began his real estate career in 1963 as a sales manager at Minchew Corporation, a home building company. In 1966, he moved to Nelson Realty as vice president of sales before founding Long & Foster. In March 2023, Wes Foster died.

Operations
Long & Foster has offices and associates in Virginia, Maryland, Washington, D.C., Pennsylvania, New Jersey, West Virginia, Delaware and North Carolina. The company has multiple lines of business that support buying, selling and owning real estate including the sale and purchase of residential (existing and new construction) and commercial properties and land; mortgage, title and settlement services, insurance and home warranties, home inspections, moving services, property management, vacation rentals, new home sales and marketing for builders and developers, and corporate real estate services for relocation and business development.

References

External links
Official website

Real estate companies established in 1968
Real estate services companies of the United States
Berkshire Hathaway
Luxury real estate
Property insurance companies
Real estate companies of the United States
Real estate brokers
Commercial real estate companies
Privately held companies of the United States
American companies established in 1968
Companies based in Fairfax County, Virginia
1968 establishments in Virginia
American real estate websites